The 1984–85 Marshall Thundering Herd men's basketball team represented Marshall University during the 1984–85 NCAA Division I men's basketball season. The Thundering Herd, led by second-year head coach Rick Huckabay, played their home games at the Cam Henderson Center as members of the Southern Conference. They finished the season 21–13, 12–4 in SoCon play to finish in second place. They defeated , The Citadel, and VMI to become champions of the SoCon tournament. They received the SoCon's automatic bid to the NCAA tournament where, as a No. 15 seed, they lost to No. 2 seed VCU in the first round.

Roster

Schedule and results

|-
!colspan=8 style=| Regular season

|-
!colspan=8 style=| SoCon tournament

|-
!colspan=8 style=| NCAA tournament

References

Marshall Thundering Herd men's basketball seasons
Marshall
Marshall
Marshall Thundering Herd basketball (men's)
Marshall Thundering Herd basketball (men's)